Unjeong Station is a railway station on the Gyeongui-Jungang Line in Paju, Gyeonggi-do, South Korea.

Station Layout

Exits

Connections
7500: Majang lake
3: Sinwon Apartment
52: Gwansan-dong,Byokjae market
80: Bakseok Station
080A: Unjeong station(Circle Line)
077: Unjeong station(Circle Line)
080A: Unjeong station(Circle Line)
080B: Unjeong station(Circle Line)
082: Dongpae Middle & High School
084: 야당역
084 (와석초): Waseok Elementary School
084 (심야): Unjeong Station
087: Eunseokgyo Sagori
088: Palhakgol
089: Jori-eup Community Center

Around the station
 Green Seoul Aquarium
 Aseowon
 Unjeong

External links

 Station information from Korail

Seoul Metropolitan Subway stations
Railway stations opened in 1956
Metro stations in Paju